The Castile and León autonomous football team is the national football team for Castile and León, Spain. They are not affiliated with FIFA or UEFA, because it is represented internationally by the Spain national football team. It only plays friendly matches.

Selected internationals

Coaches
Chus Pereda (1998)
Juan Carlos Rodríguez (2002)

Amateur team (UEFA Regions' Cup)
The amateur team of Castilla y León formed by players from the Tercera División and Preferente under 35 years, managed by Javier Yepes, have as biggest achievement the Spanish stage of the UEFA Regions' Cup in 2008. They qualified to and won the 2009 UEFA Regions' Cup, played in France.

Castile and León would repeat its title in the Spanish stage of the UEFA Regions' Cup in 2016, achieving the qualification to the 2017 edition of the European tournament.

UEFA Regions' Cup

Notable players

See also
:Category:Footballers from Castile and León
Divisiones Regionales de Fútbol in Castile and León

References
The UEFA Regions' team at the Castile and León Football Federation 

Autonomous football team
Castile and León